Robert Kilwardby (c. 1215 – 11 September 1279) was an Archbishop of Canterbury in England and a cardinal. Kilwardby was the first member of a mendicant order to attain a high ecclesiastical office in the English Church.

Life
Kilwardby studied at the University of Paris, then was a teacher of grammar and logic there. He then joined the Dominican Order and studied theology, and became regent at Oxford University before 1261, probably by 1245. He was named provincial prior of the Dominicans for England in 1261, and in October 1272 Pope Gregory X appointed him as Archbishop of Canterbury to end a dispute over the election. Kilwardby was provided to the archbishopric on 11 October 1272, given the temporalities on 12 December 1272, and consecrated on 26 February 1273.

Kilwardby crowned Edward I and his wife Eleanor as king and queen of England in August 1274, but otherwise took little part in politics. He instead concentrated on his ecclesiastical duties, including charity to the poor and donating to the Dominicans.

In 1278 Pope Nicholas III named Kilwardby Cardinal Bishop of Porto and Santa Rufina. He then resigned Canterbury and left England, taking with him papers, registers and documents belonging to the see. He also left the see deep in debt again, after his predecessor had cleared the debt. He died in Italy in 1279 and was buried in the Dominican convent in Viterbo, Italy. While in theory this was a promotion, probably it was not, as the pope was unhappy with Kilwardby's support of efforts to resist the payment of papal revenues and with the lack of effort towards the reforms demanded at the Second Council of Lyon in 1274.

Kilwardby's theological and philosophical views were summed up by David Knowles who said that he was a "conservative eclectic, holding the doctrine of seminal tendencies and opposing...the Aristotelian doctrine of the unity of form in beings, including man." Some sources state that he was the author of Summa Philosophiae, a history and description of the schools of philosophical thought then current, but the writing style is not similar to his other works, and Knowles, for one, does not believe it was authored by Kilwardby.

It has been alleged that Kilwardby was an opponent of Thomas Aquinas. In 1277 he prohibited the teaching of thirty theses, some of which have been thought to touch upon Thomas Aquinas' teaching. Recent scholars, however, such as Roland Hissette, have challenged this interpretation.

Works

Writings on grammar
 Commentaria Priscianus minor (A Commentary on the books 17 and 18 of Priscian's Institutiones grammaticae)

Writings on logic
 Notulae super librum Praedicamentorum
 Notulae super librum Perihermeneias
 Notule libri Priorum
 Notule libri Posteriorum
 Comentum super librum Topicorum
 Notulae super librum Porphyrii
 De natura relationis
 Priorum Analyticorum expositio
 Notuale super librum Sex Principiorum

Writings on natural philosophy
 De spiritu fantastico sive de receptione specierum
 De tempore

Writings on ethics
 Quaestiones supra libros Ethicorum
 Quaestiones in librum primum Sententiarum
 Quaestiones in librum secundum Sententiarum
 Quaestiones in librum tertium Sententiarum
 Quaestiones in librum quartum Sententiarum
 De ortu scientiarum

De tempore has been edited and translated by Alexander Broadie, and published as On Time and Imagination, Part 2: Introduction and Translation. A critical edition of De orto scientiarum was published by Albert G. Judy, for The Pontifical Institute of Mediaeval Studies in 1976.

The Notuel libri Priorum (on Aristotle's Prior Analytics), has been edited and translated by Paul Thom and John Scott (Oxford: Published for the British Academy by Oxford University Press, 2015; two volumes).

Kilwardby was also the author of a summary of the writings of the Church Fathers, arranged alphabetically, Tabulae super Originalia Patrum, edited by Daniel A. Callus (Bruges: De Tempel, 1948).

Citations

References

Further reading

 Lagerlund, Henrik & Thom, Paul (eds.), A Companion to the Philosophy of Robert Kilwardby, Leiden: Brill, 2012.
 Lewry, Patrick Osmund Robert Kilwardby's Writings on the Logica vetus Studied with Regard to Their Teaching and Method. Ph.D. diss. Oxford, 1978.
 Thom, Paul, Logic and Ontology in the Syllogistic of Robert Kilwardby, Leiden: Brill, 2007.

External links

 History of Medieval Philosophy by Jacques Maritain
 Kilwardby, Robert: Tabula in librum sancti Augustini De civitate Dei (1464), digitized codex at Somni

1210s births
1279 deaths
13th-century English cardinals
Cardinal-bishops of Porto
English Dominicans
Dominican cardinals
Archbishops of Canterbury
13th-century Latin writers
Scholastic philosophers
English logicians
Philosophers of science
13th-century philosophers
13th-century English writers

Year of birth uncertain